Vexillum minghuii is a species of sea snail, a marine gastropod mollusk, in the family Costellariidae, the ribbed miters.

Distribution
This species occurs in South China Sea.

References

minghuii
Gastropods described in 2017